Ondria Nichole Hardin is an American born, International Fashion Model. Launching her career with a direct booking for Prada, she has graced the covers of Vogue, and walked for almost every major Fashion Designer; known to the Industry as “The Muse”. She is a personal muse for the likes of Tom Ford, the late Karl Lagerfeld, Michael Kors, and launched Marc Jacobs Daisy fragrance campaign.

Career 

Hardin was discovered by Model Scout, Travis Guy, and placed to Mother Agency Priscilla’s Agency, & Mother Agent Doll Wright. She began her career in Tokyo, Japan. After being noticed by casting director Ashley Brokaw she was cast in a Prada campaign photographed by Steven Meisel. 

Her first editorial was for Russh magazine. She has also appeared in magazines like Vogue, Vogue China, and Allure. Hardin has walked the runway for brands including Balenciaga, Dior, Michael Kors, Jil Sander, Dolce & Gabbana, Louis Vuitton, Tommy Hilfiger, Valentino, Dries van Noten, Bottega Veneta, and Alexander McQueen.

Hardin ranked on models.com's "Top 50" list.

References 

Living people
American female models
Female models from North Carolina
People from Lumberton, North Carolina
People from Raleigh, North Carolina
1997 births